Mabat LaHadashot ( lit. A glance at the news, sometimes in short Mabat (Hebrew: מבט lit. view), was an Israeli flagship evening news program that aired continuously on the Israeli public channel from 1968 to May 9, 2017. It was Israel's first televised news program.

Mabat in television
The news program, which used to air daily on the public Channel 1, owned by the Israel Broadcasting Authority, had a broadcasting monopoly between 1968 and 1991.

The show summarizes the daily news events, through video news stories and in-studio news announcings. The characteristics of the show have evolved over the years, especially in light of the rise of the commercial channels. The main modifications can be observed in the number of story-items, that have grown over the years, and that are being more fast-told, in a way that more closely resembles a commercial channel.

In its first years as a monopoly news show, it included fewer story-items, and therefore was on a slower pace. Over the years, the story-items have grown, and thus also became shorter. The announcing form of the show have little to change over the years, and is still based on either one in-studio news presenter or an announcer, that occasionally interviews the experts in the field that is on the agenda of the daily news events. Alternately, over the years, the news show was presented by a male and female twosome.

Israel is known as a country where the news always matters. During the 1970s and '80s, just before the creation of the first commercial channel (Israeli Channel 2), the program was so popular that people avoided talking on the phone in its broadcasting time. Calling someone during the broadcast was considered to be informal.

Haim Yavin is the most veteran and known presenter of Mabat LaHadashot.  He presented the first edition of Mabat in 1968 (which was the first television news program aired in Israel), and remained on the show for over 40 years. In the years that the show was a monopoly news show. Due to his presentation of the news there, Yavin earned the nickname "Mr. Television".

Over the course of the years, "Mabat" was coined as the name for the news division of Channel 1, although the Channel 1 news division also produces many other news items and shows, but it was only the prime time news show on that channel.

In June 2010, Mabat became the first Israeli news program to be broadcast in high definition (HD 1080i).

Mabat on radio
Mabat was also being simultaneously broadcast on Reshet Bet of Kol Yisrael radio.

After years of being broadcast at 9 pm local time, it switched in May 2012 to 'shmoneh l'shmoneh' (eight minutes to eight).

See also
 Channel 1 (Israel)
 Haim Yavin

References

External links
 
  (archived)

Channel 1 (Israel) original programming
Israeli television news shows
Flagship evening news shows